İzmir Parachute Tower is a parachute tower located within Kültürpark in İzmir, Turkey. It was built in 1937 by the Turkish Aeronautical Association. It is one of the two parachute towers in the country.

History 
Mayor Behçet Uz, who saw the parachute tower in Gorky Park in Moscow, suggested that a similar tower be built in Kültürpark to the Turkish Aeronautical Association. The Turkish Aeronautical Association sent a delegation to Russia to investigate and decided to build a parachute tower in Ankara in addition to İzmir. The construction of the tower, whose architectural project was prepared by Bedri Tümay and Algrandi, started in 1935 within Kültürpark. The tower, which cost 38,758.61 Turkish liras, was completed in 1937 and opened on 9 September in the same year during the 7th İzmir International Fair. The tower operates for a fee during the fair period.

Architecture 
Seventy-five oak piles were nailed to the floor of the İzmir Parachute Tower, which was built using reinforced concrete. There is an elevator in the middle of the tower and a spiral staircase around this elevator.

References

External links 

Parachute Tower
Towers in Turkey
Parachute Tower
Towers completed in 1937
1937 establishments in Turkey
Parachute towers
Parachuting in Turkey